Mary Edith "Mollie" Fly (1847–1925) was a late 19th and early 20th century American photographer who co-founded and managed Fly's Photography Gallery in Tombstone, Arizona, with her husband, photographer C. S. Fly. She ran the studio solo for a decade after his death. There were very few women photographers in this period, and her contributions were recognized in 1989 when she was inducted into the Arizona Women's Hall of Fame.

Personal life 

Mary Edith McKie, known as Mollie, was born in 1847 and moved to San Francisco with her family in the late 1850s. Little else is known about her early life, and nothing is known about how she got her photographic training.

She married twice, first to a man named Samuel D. Goodrich whom she divorced after two years. In 1879, she married photographer Camillus Sidney "Buck" Fly in San Francisco; they later adopted a daughter, Kitty.

Photographic career 

The Flys moved to the boom town of Tombstone in Arizona Territory in 1879 and set up a photographic studio. Initially it was housed in a tent, but by mid 1880 they had built a 12-room boarding house at 312 Fremont St., with their Fly's Photography Gallery housed in the back part of the premises. In 1881, the Gunfight at the O.K. Corral took place in a lot next to the boarding house, and Ike Clanton escaped through the boarding house during the fight.

Buck was often gone on photographic expeditions, and during his absence Fly ran both the boarding house and Fly's Photography Gallery, taking studio portraits for 35 cents apiece. It is not known how many photographs she took because almost all the known images from Fly's Photography Gallery are credited to her husband. There are a couple of extant postcards of street scenes credited to her.

Buck became a heavy drinker, and Fly separated from him for a time in 1887. By the late 1880s, Tombstone was suffering from a declining economy, so in 1893, the Flys moved to Phoenix, Arizona and opened a new photography studio. This business failed and they returned to Tombstone a year later.

The Flys separated again in the late 1890s, at which time Buck opened a studio in the copper-mining town of Bisbee, Arizona. Here the Flys suffered the first of two fires that would destroy a large portion of their collection of glass-plate negatives; in this case, the negatives lost were in storage at the Phelps Dodge Mercantile Company warehouse.

While Buck was in Bisbee, Fly ran the Tombstone studio on her own, continuing to do so for another decade after Buck's death in Bisbee in 1901. In 1905, she published a collection of Buck's photographs entitled Scenes in Geronimo’s Camp: The Apache Outlaw and Murderer.

Fly retired in 1912, and three years later a fire burned the studio to the ground. She moved to Los Angeles, where she died in 1925. Many of the Flys' negatives had been destroyed in the two fires, but Fly donated her remaining collection of photographic negatives to the Smithsonian Institution in Washington, D.C.

In popular culture 

 Fly is a character in Romain Wilhelmsen's 1999 novel Buckskin and Satin.
 Fly is a character in Margaret Mater's 2009 novel What Might Have Been.

References 

Photographers from Arizona
1847 births
1925 deaths
Artists from Tucson, Arizona
Businesspeople from Arizona
19th-century American photographers
20th-century American photographers
20th-century American women photographers
19th-century American women photographers